Tisvildeleje station is the main railway station serving the seaside resort town of Tisvildeleje on the north coast of North Zealand, Denmark.

The station is the terminus of the Tisvildeleje branch of the Gribskov Line from Hillerød to Tisvildeleje. The train services are currently operated by the railway company Lokaltog which runs frequent local train services from Tisvildeleje to Hillerød station.

External links

Lokaltog

Railway stations in the Capital Region of Denmark
Buildings and structures in Gribskov Municipality
Railway stations opened in 1924
1924 establishments in Denmark
Railway stations in Denmark opened in the 20th century